MIS18 binding protein 1 is a protein that in humans is encoded by the MIS18BP1 gene. The gene is also known as LKNL2, M18BP1, C14orf106, and HSA242977.

Model organisms

Model organisms have been used in the study of MIS18BP1 function. A conditional knockout mouse line, called Mis18bp1tm1a(EUCOMM)Wtsi was generated as part of the International Knockout Mouse Consortium program — a high-throughput mutagenesis project to generate and distribute animal models of disease to interested scientists.

Male and female animals underwent a standardized phenotypic screen to determine the effects of deletion. Twenty five tests were carried out on mutant mice and three significant abnormalities were observed. Few homozygous mutant embryos were identified during gestation, and none survived until weaning. The remaining tests were carried out on heterozygous mutant adult mice and an abnormal tail morphology was observed in female animals.

References

Further reading 
 

Human proteins
Genes mutated in mice